Winter Journal is an autobiographical work by Paul Auster published in 2012. It is a companion volume to Auster's Report from the Interior (2013), which appeared the following year.

External links

References

2012 non-fiction books
Books by Paul Auster
Henry Holt and Company books
Faber and Faber books